Umarkhadi is an area in South Mumbai near Byculla and Pydhone.

Neighbourhoods in Mumbai
Villages in Mumbai City district